The Little Yarra River is a perennial river of the Port Phillip catchment, located in the Greater Metropolitan Melbourne region of the Australian state of Victoria.

Location and features
The river descends  over its  course.
 
The river is traversed by the Warburton Highway east of Yarra Junction.

See also

 Geography of the Yarra River
 List of rivers of Victoria

References

Melbourne Water catchment
Rivers of Greater Melbourne (region)
Tributaries of the Yarra River